Juan de la Jaraquemada, (Canary Islands ? – † Santiago of Chile, April 1612); Spanish soldier, designated by the viceroy of Peru Juan de Mendoza y Luna, Marquess of Montesclaros, Captain General and Governor of Chile, and president of the Real Audiencia of Santiago.  He served from January 1, 1611 to March 27, 1612

References 

1612 deaths
People from the Canary Islands
Royal Governors of Chile
Spanish soldiers
Year of birth unknown